Felix Cicaterri, (S.J.) (July 3, 1804 – July 15, 1873)  was the third president of Santa Clara University, California, United States. He was also a one-time rector of Verona's Jesuit College. In 1848 he was made president of the Jesuit College at Vienna now the University of Vienna. After immigrating to the United States, he was a professor of divinity at St. John's College in Fordham, New York. Later he taught philosophy at Georgetown College in the United States. On March 11, 1857, Cicaterri was appointed Santa Clara University's third president and inherited the financial woes created by construction projects. Cicaterri was removed from the University's presidency in 1861 due to Rome's displeasure. In January 1873, he was sent to the College of the Sacred Heart in Woodstock, Maryland, where he died July 15, 1873.

References

External sources
 
 

1804 births
1873 deaths
19th-century American Jesuits
19th-century Italian Jesuits
Santa Clara University faculty
Santa Clara University people
Presidents of Santa Clara University
Italian emigrants to the United States